Marsdenia flavescens, the Yellow Milk Vine is a vine found in eastern Australia. Other common names include Hairy Milk Vine and Native Potato.

The original specimen was collected by the explorer Allan Cunningham in the Illawarra district in the early 19th century. According to this text by the describing scientist William Jackson Hooker,  these plants were grown at Kew Gardens in London. "Mr. ALLAN CUNNINGHAM, who found it in New Holland, on the sea-shore at the Illawana district, in lat. 341/2°, whence living plants were imported to His Majesty's Gardens at Kew." sic.

The specific epithet flavescens is from Latin, and it refers to the pale yellow flowers.

References

Marsdenia
Flora of Queensland
Flora of New South Wales
Flora of Victoria (Australia)